Chandrapura Thermal Power Station is a thermal power plant located in Chandrapura Town in the Indian state of Jharkhand. The power plant is operated by the Damodar Valley Corporation Central Government Owned with jharkhand Government And West Bengal Government.  It has two units with a total installed capacity of 500 MW(2×250 MW); both burn pulverised coal.

Capacity
Chandrapura Thermal Power Station has an installed capacity of 630 MW. The plant has 3 units under operation. The individual units has the generating capacity as follows:

References

Coal-fired power stations in Jharkhand
Bokaro district
1964 establishments in Bihar
Energy infrastructure completed in 1964